Gunung Padang is a megalithic site located in Karyamukti, Campaka, Cianjur Regency, West Java, Indonesia,  southwest of the regency seat or  from  station. It is covered with massive hexagonal stone columns of volcanic origin. The Sundanese people consider the site sacred and believe it was the result of King Siliwangi's attempt to build a palace in one night.

Gunung Padang consists of a series of five artificial terraces, one rectangular and four trapezoidal, that occur, one through five, at successively higher elevations. These terraces also become sucessively smaller with elevation with the first terrace as the lowest and largest and the fifth terrace as the highest and smallest. These terraces lie along the a central, longitudinal NW-SE axis. They are artificial platforms created by lowering high spots and filling inlow spots with fill until a flat surface was achieved. The terrace perimeters consist of perimeter retaining walls formed by volcanic polygonal columns stacked horizontally and posted vertically as posts.

History of study 

Dutch historian Rogier Verbeek mentioned the existence of the Gunung Padang site in his book "", based on a visit and report by M. De Corte in 1890

The notes on the Gunung Padang site in Verbeek's book are similar to those made by Dutch archaeologist Nicolaas Johannes Krom in the 1914 Rapporten van de Oudheidkundige Dienst (ROD, "Report of the Department of Antiquities"). 

After 1914, this site was ignored until 1979, when a group of local farmers rediscovered Gunung Padang. This discovery quickly attracted the attention of the Bandung Institute of Archaeology, the Directorate of Antiquities, PUSPAN (now the Center for Archaeological Research and Development), the local government, and various community groups. Throughout the 1980s, these organizations conducted joint archaeological research and restoration work at Gunung Padang. In 1998, the Indonesian Ministry of Education and Culture declared it a heritage site of local interest.

On 1 October 2014, surveyors halted excavation activities temporarily, hoping to begin them again under the new government. The 2014 excavation has been criticized for being improperly conducted.

Age estimates 

Pottery fragments found at the site were dated by the Bureau of Archaeology in the range 45 BCE – 22 CE.

Fringe dating 
Based on still unpublished and undisclosed number of carbon dates and stratigraphic studies, Danny Hilman Natawidjaja, an Indonesian geologist who is an expert in earthquake geology and geotectonics, suggested on that the site had been built as a giant pyramid 9,000 to 20,000 years ago, implying the existence of an otherwise unknown advanced ancient civilization. However, none of these radiocarbon dates, along with their stratigraphic context, have been formally published and the age of this site based on these dates differs greatly depending on the publication consulted even when the publications are by the same author explaining the results of the same research.

Natawidjaja's analysis was questioned by other scientists. Vulcanologist Sutikno Bronto suggested that the carbon dating result was influenced by weathering and concluded that the elevation is the neck of an ancient volcano and not a man-made pyramid. Thirty-four Indonesian scientists signed a petition questioning the motives and methods of the Hilman-Arif team. Archaeologist Víctor Pérez described Natawidjaja's conclusions as pseudoarchaeology.

Natawidjaja's conclusions gained the attention of Indonesia's President Susilo Bambang Yudhoyono, who set up a task force. An archaeologist who did not wish to be named due to the involvement of the country's president, stated:

See also
 List of places with columnar jointed volcanics
 Nan Madol - ruined city in Federated States of Micronesesia

References

Further reading

External links 

 Evidences of Large pyramid-like structure predating 10,000 Year BP at Mount Padang, West Java, Indonesia: Applications of geological-geophysical methods to explore buried large archeological site
 

Megalithic monuments
Archaeological sites in Indonesia
Cianjur Regency
Extinct volcanoes
Archaeological controversies
Pyramids in Indonesia
Nationalism and archaeology